Leonardo Fabio Duque (born April 10, 1980 in Cali, Valle del Cauca) is a French-Colombian professional road racing cyclist, who last rode for the  team. After stage 19 of the 2009 Tour de France, Duque was named the most combative rider of the stage after aggressively pacing a breakaway. In 2011 he became the first Colombian-born cyclist to finish the cobbled One Day Cycling Monuments, the Tour of Flanders and Paris–Roubaix. He also competed in the men's Madison at the 2004 Summer Olympics.

Career achievements

Major results

2001
 2nd  Team pursuit, UCI Track World Cup
2003
 National Track Championships
1st  Points race
1st  Madison
1st  Scratch race
 Pan American Games
2nd  Madison
3rd  Points race
 Vuelta a Guatemala
1st Stages 6 & 11
2004
 1st GP de la Ville de Pérenchies
 1st Stage 3 Vuelta a Colombia
2005
 1st Druivenkoers
 1st Stage 2 Tour de l'Ain
2006
 1st  Overall Tour du Limousin
 6th Paris–Camembert
2007
 1st Stage 16 Vuelta a España
 3rd Boucles de l'Aulne
2008
 1st Stage 4 Tour Méditerranéen
 7th GP Miguel Indurain
2009
 4th Trofeo Calvia
 5th Paris–Camembert
2010
 1st Overall French Road Cycling Cup
 1st Cholet-Pays de Loire
 2nd Tour du Finistère
 3rd Tour du Doubs
 4th GP Ouest–France
 5th Paris–Camembert
 7th Grand Prix Cycliste de Montréal
2011
 4th Gran Premio dell'Insubria-Lugano
 5th Gran Premio di Lugano
 7th Tour de la Somme
2012
 3rd Overall Tour de Picardie
 4th E3 Harelbeke
2013
 1st Gran Premio Bruno Beghelli
 1st Stage 1 Tour de l'Ain
 6th Roma Maxima
 10th Grand Prix de Fourmies
2014
 1st  Sprints classification, Giro del Trentino
2015
 5th Gran Premio Bruno Beghelli
 8th Coppa Sabatini
2016
 1st  Overall Tour of Taihu Lake
1st Stage 7
 7th Paris–Camembert
 7th Tour of Yancheng Coastal Wetlands
 10th Overall Tour of Hainan

Grand Tour general classification results timeline

References

External links

Colombian male cyclists
1980 births
Living people
Colombian Vuelta a España stage winners
Cyclists at the 2003 Pan American Games
Sportspeople from Antioquia Department
Pan American Games medalists in cycling
Pan American Games silver medalists for Colombia
Pan American Games bronze medalists for Colombia
Olympic cyclists of Colombia
Cyclists at the 2004 Summer Olympics
Medalists at the 2003 Pan American Games
20th-century Colombian people
21st-century Colombian people